Branden Jackson (born November 11, 1992) is a former American football defensive end. He played college football at Texas Tech.

College career
Jackson played four years at Texas Tech, appearing in 51 games with 38 starts, totalling 138 tackles, 11 sacks, three forced fumbles, two fumble recoveries, and one pass defensed.

Professional career

Oakland Raiders
Jackson signed with the Oakland Raiders as an undrafted free agent on May 16, 2016. He was released by the Raiders on September 3, 2016 and was signed to the practice squad the next day. On December 3, 2016, he was promoted to the active roster.

On September 2, 2017, Jackson was waived by the Raiders.

Seattle Seahawks
On September 26, 2017, Jackson was signed to the Seattle Seahawks' practice squad. He was promoted to the active roster on October 7, 2017.

On September 2, 2018, Jackson was waived by the Seahawks and was re-signed to the practice squad. He was promoted to the active roster on September 25, 2018.

Jackson re-signed with the Seahawks on April 23, 2020. He was released on July 26, 2020, but was re-signed on August 6. He was placed on injured reserve due to a career ending neck injury on August 30, 2020.

NFL Statistics

References

External links
Texas Tech Red Raiders bio
Oakland Raiders bio

1992 births
Living people
Sportspeople from McKeesport, Pennsylvania
Players of American football from Pennsylvania
American football defensive ends
Texas Tech Red Raiders football players
Oakland Raiders players
Seattle Seahawks players